Anfield Community Comprehensive School was a secondary school in the Anfield area of Liverpool, England. The school had over 1100 pupils. The Anfield code was "Committed to achievement in the community".

History 
Located in the inner-city, the school struggled in academic performance indicators, but experienced a dramatic turn around in GCSE pass rates in the 1993 and 1994 results. A 1995 Times report profiling the "quiet revolution" cited a cleaner environment, uniforms, and a new code of conduct as causes for the change.

Closure 
Closure was planned in 2005 due to amalgamation with Breckfield Comprehensive School, some parents formed the Anfield Parents Action Group to organise opposition.

The school closed in 2006, and the merged school opened as the North Liverpool Academy. The North Liverpool Academy's first site was the Anfield building on Priory Road. The academy later moved to a new site near to Everton Park.

Recent Development Proposal 
Demolition of the school buildings commenced towards the end of 2010 and completed in early 2011. Liverpool City Council is currently exploring options for the redevelopment of the site in conjunction with local stakeholders. The site will be made available for development  purposes as ond part of the new Anfield Project, launched by the City Council on 24 June 2013.

Notable former pupils

 Roy Boulter, drummer in the 1990s The Farm (British band)
 The Christians (band)
 Neil Fitzmaurice, actor and comedian
 Lee Douglas, Anathema (band) singer
 Sonia Evans, 1990s singer.

References 
Alderson, K. (1 February 1995). Children speak volumes for quiet revolution. The Times, home news.

External links 
Department of Education statistics
Statistics from the BBC
Ofsted report on Anfield

Defunct schools in Liverpool
Educational institutions disestablished in 2006
2006 disestablishments in England
Educational institutions established in 1964
1964 establishments in England